Michael Paul Husbands (born 13 November 1983) is a footballer who plays as a winger and forward.

He began his professional football career with Aston Villa in 2002. He was loaned out to Hereford United, before signing with Southend United in 2003. In 2005, he moved to Port Vale via Bristol Rovers and Walsall. After two seasons with Vale he joined Macclesfield Town. There he was loaned out to Telford United, before he finished his career with Oxford United in 2008. He served as an Elite Commando in the Royal Marines. He accepted a call-up from the Saint Lucia national team in September 2012, and returned to club football with Redditch United in December 2012.

Club career
Husbands, a forward, began his career at Aston Villa as an associated schoolboy in 1998, and he was a member of the FA Youth Cup winning team of 2001–02. He had a trial at Macclesfield Town before he joined Hereford United on loan in December 2002, he made five substitute appearances over his two months at Edgar Street.

He was allowed to join Southend United in July 2003; he spent two years at the club, but played only 16 games due to a number of injuries including a pelvic problem. In August 2005 he joined Bristol Rovers for a short spell on a non-contract basis before moving on to Walsall the next month and then Port Vale in October 2005. Husbands made 47 league appearances for the "Valiants". The highlight of his time at Vale Park was on 26 September 2006 against Nottingham Forest, he scored within 14 seconds – the fastest goal of that season.

He was released by Port Vale in July 2007, and joined Macclesfield Town, where he became Ian Brightwell's first signing as manager. He joined Telford United of the Conference North on a one-month loan in November, which was extended by a month after he impressed at New Bucks Head, before the loan was eventually extended until the end of the season. Husbands made 25 appearances for the Shropshire side scoring three times. He rejected the opportunity to sign permanently at the end of the campaign and so after a trial at Cheltenham Town in July, he opted to join Oxford United in the Conference National in August 2008. Manager Darren Patterson urged him to make the most of this opportunity, saying, "For whatever reason he's had lots of clubs, but you can see his sharpness. Maybe this is the last chance saloon for Michael. He needs a club where he plays regularly and scores goals." However, he was released by Oxford at the end of the month after his contract expired.

After leaving the professional game, Husbands joined the Royal Marines. He made his debut for the Marines football team against the Devon & Somerset Fire Service on 18 May 2010, scoring twice in the game.

In December 2012, he returned to English football with Southern League club Redditch United.

International career
Husbands is of Saint Lucian descent, but for many years chose not to represent Saint Lucia in international competitions. He finally accepted a call-up and was named to their squad for the 2012 Caribbean Cup qualification. He had not played professionally for over four years, though had remained fit as he was serving in the Royal Marines. He did not end up featuring at the qualification stage, and Saint Lucia did not qualify.

Career statistics

Honours
Aston Villa
FA Youth Cup: 2002

References

External links

1983 births
Living people
Footballers from Birmingham, West Midlands
English footballers
English people of Saint Lucian descent
Black British sportspeople
People with acquired Saint Lucian citizenship
Saint Lucian footballers
Association football wingers
Association football forwards
Aston Villa F.C. players
Hereford United F.C. players
Southend United F.C. players
Bristol Rovers F.C. players
Walsall F.C. players
Port Vale F.C. players
AFC Telford United players
Macclesfield Town F.C. players
Oxford United F.C. players
Redditch United F.C. players
English Football League players
National League (English football) players
Southern Football League players
21st-century Royal Marines personnel
Royal Marines ranks